Transmural care is the interface between primary and secondary care in medicine.

References

Types of health care facilities